Kevin Gaughan (born 6 March 1978) is a Scottish footballer who played 'senior' for Partick Thistle, Raith Rovers, Stirling Albion, Stranraer, Stenhousemuir and Dumbarton.

References

1978 births
Scottish footballers
Association football defenders
Dumbarton F.C. players
Raith Rovers F.C. players
Partick Thistle F.C. players
Stenhousemuir F.C. players
Stranraer F.C. players
Stirling Albion F.C. players
Scottish Football League players
Living people
Footballers from Glasgow